The former Morrilton station is located on Railroad Avenue, between Division and Moose Streets, in downtown Morrilton, Arkansas.  It is a single-story brick building, with a tile roof and Mediterranean styling typical of the stations of the Missouri Pacific Railroad.  The broadly overhanging roof is supported by large brackets, with a telegrapher's bay projecting on the track side.  Built about 1907, it is an important reminder of the railroad's importance in the city's history.  It now houses a local history museum.

The building was listed on the National Register of Historic Places in 1977 as "Morrilton Railroad Station".

See also
National Register of Historic Places listings in Conway County, Arkansas

References

Railway stations on the National Register of Historic Places in Arkansas
Railway stations in the United States opened in 1875
Buildings and structures in Morrilton, Arkansas
Individually listed contributing properties to historic districts on the National Register in Arkansas
1975 establishments in Arkansas
National Register of Historic Places in Conway County, Arkansas
Former Missouri Pacific Railroad stations
Mediterranean Revival architecture in Arkansas
Former railway stations in Arkansas